Groenvlei Secondary School is a school in the Western Cape

References

External links
 opensoftwarealliance

Schools in Cape Town